Trivimi Velliste (born 4 May 1947, in Tartu, Estonia) is an Estonian politician who served as Minister of Foreign Affairs from 1992 to 1994 and as the Estonian Ambassador to the United Nations from 1994 to 1998. He currently is a Member of Parliament in the Riigikogu representing the Pärnumaa Electoral District.

Velliste is considered one of the leading forces behind the liberation of the Baltic States. His fight for Estonian identity as a foundation for the struggle to gain independence was an affront to the Russians and was conducted at great personal risk. Velliste deliberately encouraged the drive for national and political freedom. In accordance with his beliefs, he founded a society for the protection of Estonian historical monuments. Velliste considered knowledge of the past to be a necessity in the fight for elementary human rights on the road to self-government and self-confidence.

In 1988, Mr Velliste was awarded the second Rafto Prize.

External links

Riigikogu Information Page

1947 births
Living people
Politicians from Tartu
Ministers of Foreign Affairs of Estonia
Permanent Representatives of Estonia to the United Nations
Recipients of the Order of the National Coat of Arms, 2nd Class
Recipients of the Order of the National Coat of Arms, 4th Class
Hugo Treffner Gymnasium alumni
Members of the Riigikogu, 1992–1995
Members of the Riigikogu, 1999–2003
Members of the Riigikogu, 2003–2007
Members of the Riigikogu, 2007–2011
University of Tartu alumni
20th-century Estonian politicians
21st-century Estonian politicians